Yolande Jobin (30 May 1930 – 11 October 2010) was a Swiss figure skater. She was the 1951 Swiss national champion. She represented Switzerland at the 1952 Winter Olympics where she placed 18th. After the 1953 World Championships in Davos she retired from competitive skating. She then spent several Winters in Crans coaching young people at the ice rink. In the early 1960s she retired from all skating and settled in La Tour de Peilz near Vevey with her parents who had retired there from London. She spent the rest of her life there, looking after her elderly parents. She never married.

Competitive highlights

References

 Sports-reference profile
 List of Historical Swiss Champions
 Skatabase: 1950s World Championships: Ladies Results
 Skatabase: 1950s European Championships: Ladies Results

Swiss female single skaters
Olympic figure skaters of Switzerland
Figure skaters at the 1952 Winter Olympics
1930 births
2010 deaths